Jinqiao is a town of Pudong, Shanghai, China. It is in the middle of Pudong, with Zhangjiang Hi-Tech Park on its south, Huangpu River at its north, overlooking Lujiazui Financial and Trade Center to its west. On its north side, is Waigaoqiao Free Trade Zone and harbor. Jinqiao has a national development zone - Jinqiao Export Processing Zone. The area contains a relatively high proportion of foreign nationals and is notable for its large number of International Schools and comfortable environment.

It governs seven villages, seven residential areas, and one international community. The registered population is over 28,000, while the floating population is over 87,000. More than 3,000 foreigners live in Jinqiao.

In recent times, before massive reconstruction, the area was known for its prostitution circles which had stalled the economic development of the area, and is something that still exists under cover in its numerous massage centres.

Amenities
Jinqiao has developed rapidly over the last few years. It has a number of international schools including; Dulwich College Shanghai and Concordia International School Shanghai. It does not, however, contain the Shanghai Science and Technology Museum.

Economy
As a part of Shanghai Free Trade Zone, the modern service industry has become the most important part in economic development.

Many shopping centers have been built in Jinqiao, and have become popular places for families to spend in weekends and holidays, such as Jinqiao International Commercial Center.

Housing

There are many expat housing compounds in Jinqiao, including:
 Vizcaya - A Spanish style compound 
 Green court - Large red brick apartments
 Old Green Villas - English style houses
 New Green Villas - This compound is divided into different style houses
 Shimao Lakeside - A compound of western style apartments and villas

Transportation

Road
The Middle Ring of Shanghai passes through Jinqiao.

Metro
Jinqiao Road Station of Shanghai Metro line 6 is near the Jinqiao International Commercial Center. Other parts of lines 6, 9, and 12 pass through Jinqiao.

See also
 Shezhuang Temple

Pudong
Special Economic Zones of China
Towns in Shanghai